Jerome Prince may refer to:
 Jerome Prince (legal scholar), American attorney, academic administrator, and legal scholar
 Jerome Prince (politician), mayor of Gary, Indiana